Apache Longbow may refer to:
 Apache Longbow (video game), computer game released by Digital Integration
 The AH-64D variant of the AH-64 Apache, a twin-engine attack helicopter

See also
 Longbow